The following lists events that happened during 1959 in the Grand Duchy of Luxembourg.

Incumbents

Events

January – March
 1 February – Elections are held to the Chamber of Deputies.  The Christian Social People's Party loses 5 seats, while the Democratic Party gains five.
 23 February – Prime Minister Pierre Frieden dies in Zürich, twenty-two days after winning re-election.
 2 March – Pierre Werner becomes Prime Minister, seven days after the death of his Christian Social People's Party colleague Pierre Frieden.  He forms a new government in coalition with the Democratic Party, with Eugène Schaus in the new office as Deputy Prime Minister.
 11 March – Luxembourg misses the Eurovision Song Contest for the first time: the only time before the country's withdrawal from the contest since 1993.

April – June
 7 June – Charly Gaul wins the 1959 Giro d'Italia.

July – September
 4 August – Nicolas Margue is appointed to the Council of State.

October – December
 30 December – Paul Wilwertz is re-appointed to the Council of State, having previously been a member from 1945 to 1954.

Births
 12 April – Andy Bausch, film director
 18 May – Ranga Yogeshwar, scientist
 8 October – Claude Michely, cyclist
 28 December – Antoine, Prince of Ligne

Deaths
 23 February – Pierre Frieden, politician and Prime Minister
 2 December – Leo Müller, politician and journalist

Footnotes

References